Charles Benjamin Schudson (born 1950) is a Wisconsin Reserve Judge Emeritus, law professor, judicial educator, keynote speaker, and author.

Biography

Schudson was born in Milwaukee, Wisconsin, in 1950. He is a graduate of Dartmouth College (Class of 1972) and the University of Wisconsin Law School. Schudson and his wife, Karen, have two children and five grandchildren.

Career
Schudson worked as a state and federal prosecutor from 1975 until 1982, when he was appointed to the  Wisconsin Circuit Court by Governor Lee Sherman Dreyfus. In 1992, he was elected to the Wisconsin Court of Appeals, where he served twelve years. Subsequent to his judicial career, he served as senior counsel at von Briesen & Roper, S.C., and as General Counsel for La Causa, Inc.

Throughout and following his judicial career, Schudson served on the faculties of Marquette University Law School, University of Wisconsin Law School, the National Council of Juvenile and Family Court Judges, and the National Judicial College. For Lawrence University, he has served as the “Law and Literature Scholar in Residence,” and, for fifteen years and currently, as a presenter for Lawrence’s “Björklunden Seminars.”  Teaching at law schools in Bolivia, Germany, and Peru, 2009-14, he served as a Fulbright Scholar.

Schudson has presented keynotes and seminars at approximately three hundred judicial and professional conferences throughout the world. He has testified before congressional committees and the U.S. Commission on Civil Rights on battered women; he was the lead witness before the U.S. Senate Judiciary Committee hearings on child sexual abuse. He has been featured on NPR’s All Things Considered, PBS’s The MacNeil-Lehrer Report, and Oprah.  

For his work in the investigation and prosecution of Medicaid fraud and nursing home crimes, Schudson received the U.S. Justice Department’s Award for Superior Performance. During his judicial career, he received honors including: Wisconsin Judge of the Year; Foundation for the Improvement of Justice Award; and the National Human Rights Leadership Award.

Schudson has authored hundreds of published appellate decisions and other works, including: On Trial / America’s Courts and Their Treatment of Sexually Abused Children ( Beacon Press 1989; 2d ed., 1991); and Independence Corrupted / How America’s Judges Make Their Decisions (University of Wisconsin Press, 2018; Amazon Kindle 2022), winner of the Figure Foundation grant, and a nominee for the ABA Silver Gavel Award, the Chautauqua Prize, and the National Book Award.

Electoral history

Wisconsin Circuit Court (1983, 1989)

| colspan="6" style="text-align:center;background-color: #e9e9e9;"| General Election, April 5, 1983

| colspan="6" style="text-align:center;background-color: #e9e9e9;"| General Election, April 4, 1989

Wisconsin Court of Appeals (1992, 1998, 2004)

| colspan="6" style="text-align:center;background-color: #e9e9e9;"| General Election, April 7, 1992

| colspan="6" style="text-align:center;background-color: #e9e9e9;"| General Election, April 7, 1998

| colspan="6" style="text-align:center;background-color: #e9e9e9;"| General Election, April 6, 2004

References

Politicians from Milwaukee
Wisconsin Court of Appeals judges
Wisconsin lawyers
Dartmouth College alumni
University of Wisconsin Law School alumni
University of Wisconsin Law School faculty
Marquette University faculty
Lawrence University faculty
1950 births
Living people
Lawyers from Milwaukee
20th-century American judges
21st-century American judges